Tayfur Bingöl (born 11 January 1993) is a Turkish professional footballer who plays as a right-back for Beşiktaş on loan from Alanyaspor.

Career
Bingöl spent his youth development between the youth academies of Gençlerbirliği and Hacettepe, before formally joining the senior team of Haceteppe in the 2011–12 season. In 2012, he returned to Gençlerbirliği and made his professional debut with the Turkish Süper Lig in a 5–3 loss to Antalyaspor on 20 January 2013. He went on a series of developmental loans with Haceteppe, Bandırmaspor, Adana Demirspor, and Alanyaspor before transferring to Göztepe in 2016. After establishing himself as a starter there, he earned a moved to Alanyaspor, returning to the top division in Turkey.

International career
Bingöl is a youth international for Turkey, and has represented the Turkey U20s and U21s.

References
 
Tayfur Bingöl Göztepe'de‚ fanatik.com.tr, 24 June 2016
Tayfur Bingöl Aytemiz Alanyasporumuzda‚ alanyaspor.org.tr, 3 June 2019

External links

1993 births
Living people
People from Çankaya, Ankara
Turkish footballers
Turkey youth international footballers
Hacettepe S.K. footballers
Gençlerbirliği S.K. footballers
Adana Demirspor footballers
Alanyaspor footballers
Göztepe S.K. footballers
Bursaspor footballers
Beşiktaş J.K. footballers
Süper Lig players
TFF First League players
TFF Second League players
Turkey under-21 international footballers
Association football defenders